The 1984 United States presidential election in Oregon took place on November 6, 1984. All fifty states and the District of Columbia were part of the 1984 United States presidential election. Voters chose seven electors to the Electoral College, which selected the president and vice president of the United States.

Oregon was won by incumbent United States President Ronald Reagan of California, who was running against former Vice President Walter Mondale of Minnesota. Reagan ran for a second time with incumbent Vice President and former C.I.A. Director George H. W. Bush of Texas, and Mondale ran with Representative Geraldine Ferraro of New York, the first major female candidate for the vice presidency. To date, it is the last time Oregon has voted for a Republican in a presidential election, and also the last time Lincoln County, Benton County and Hood River County have voted for a Republican presidential nominee.

Partisan background
The presidential election of 1984 was a very partisan election for Oregon, with the Democratic or Republican parties the only parties appearing on the ballot. The vast majority of counties turned out for Reagan, including the typically right-leaning eastern interior and southwestern Rogue Valley. The only exceptions were Lane County in the central west, which had voted Republican in 1980, and three counties along the lower Columbia River, including Portland's highly populated Multnomah County, which has been a Democratic stronghold since voting for Richard Nixon in 1960.

Oregon weighed in for this election as 3% more Democratic than the national average.

Republican victory
Reagan won the election in Oregon with a decisive 12 point landslide. This result nonetheless made Oregon slightly over 6% more Democratic than the nation-at-large. The election results in Oregon are reflective of a nationwide reconsolidation of base for the Republican Party which took place through the 1980s; called by Reagan the "second American Revolution." This was most evident during the 1984 presidential election. No Republican candidate has received as strong of support in the American Pacific states at large, as Reagan did. This is also the most recent election cycle where Oregon sent Republican electors to the Electoral College.

It is speculated that Mondale lost support with voters nearly immediately during the campaign, namely during his acceptance speech at the 1984 Democratic National Convention. There he stated that he intended to increase taxes. To quote Mondale, "By the end of my first term, I will reduce the Reagan budget deficit by two thirds. Let's tell the truth. It must be done, it must be done. Mr. Reagan will raise taxes, and so will I. He won't tell you. I just did." Despite this claimed attempt at establishing truthfulness with the electorate, this claim to raise taxes badly eroded his chances in what had already begun as an uphill battle against the charismatic Ronald Reagan.

Reagan also enjoyed high levels of bipartisan support during the 1984 presidential election, both in Oregon, and across the nation at large. Many registered Democrats who voted for Reagan (Reagan Democrats) stated that they had chosen to do so because they associated him with the economic recovery, because of his strong stance on national security issues with the Soviet Union, and because they considered the Democrats as "supporting American poor and minorities at the expense of the middle class." These public opinion factors contributed to Reagan's 1984 landslide victory, in Oregon and elsewhere.

Results

Results by county

See also
 United States presidential elections in Oregon
 Presidency of Ronald Reagan

References

Oregon
1984
1984 Oregon elections